The 10,000 yen coin is a denomination of the Japanese yen, and is only used for the issue of commemorative coins struck by the Japan Mint. 10,000 yen coins were first issued in the mid/late 1980s in silver but were later switched to gold. These non consecutive commemorative gold coins have been released ever since to collectors.

History
The first 10,000 yen coin was minted in 1986 as a silver commemorative to mark the 60th year of the enthronement of the Shōwa Emperor, Hirohito. Gold has been used to strike these coins in proof only format since 1997 when they were first issued for the 1998 Winter Olympics in Nagano. The weight and size of each coin varies by commemorative as both 15.6g (26mm) and 20.0g (28 - 35mm) have been used.

List of commemoratives

Notes

References

External links

Commemorative coin list - Japan Mint website (In English)

Japanese yen coins
Commemorative coins of Japan